
Year 730 (DCCXXX) was a common year starting on Sunday (link will display the full calendar) of the Julian calendar. The denomination 730 for this year has been used since the early medieval period, when the Anno Domini calendar era became the prevalent method in Europe for naming years.

Events 
 By place 
 Europe 
 King Liutprand contracts an alliance with Eutychius, exarch of Ravenna, and agrees to support him in his attack on Rome, while subjugating the independent southern Lombard duchies of Benevento and Spoleto.
 Tiberius Petasius proclaims himself emperor in Tuscia. Eutychius defeats him with the support of Pope Gregory II, and Tiberius is killed in Monterano, with his head sent to the Byzantine emperor Leo III as a gift.
 Charles Martel defeats the last independent dukedom of Alamannia, and incorporates it into the Frankish Empire. He also launches raids on the Saxons beyond the Rhine.

 Arabian Empire 
 September - October – Umayyad forces sack the Byzantine fortress of Charsianon in central Anatolia (modern Turkey), which remains a contested stronghold during the next century of Byzantine–Arab warfare.
 December 9 – Battle of Marj Ardabil: The Khazars under Barjik invade the provinces of Jibal and Adharybaydjian. He defeats an Umayyad army (25,000 men) at Ardabil (Iran), killing al-Jarrah ibn Abdallah.

 China 
 Emperor Xuan Zong has four palace walls in the northeast sector of the capital city Chang'an dismantled and reassembled to construct a new Daoist abbey, the grounds of which are formally a large garden for the Bureau of Agriculture.

 By topic 
 In this decade Hops are first cultivated in Germany, in the Hallertau region.

 Religion 
 Leo III of the Byzantine Empire orders the destruction of all icons, beginning the First Iconoclastic Period. Many monks flee to Greece and Italy (taking smaller icons with them, hidden in their clothing); others flee to the caves of the Cappadocian desert.

Births 
 Al-Rabi' ibn Yunus, Arab minister (approximate date)
 Autpert Ambrose, Frankish Benedictine monk (d. 784)
 Beatus of Liébana, monk and theologian (approximate date)
 Jia Dan, general of the Tang Dynasty (d. 805)
 Offa, king of Mercia (approximate date)
 Tarasios, patriarch of Constantinople (approximate date)
 Zhang Xiaozhong, general of the Tang Dynasty (d. 791)

Deaths 
 December 9 – Al-Jarrah ibn Abdallah, Arab general
 Corbinian, Frankish bishop (approximate date)
 Hugh of Champagne, grandson of Pepin of Herstal
 K'inich Ahkal Mo' Naab III, Maya ruler of Palenque
 Lantfrid, duke of Alamannia
 Peter, duke of Cantabria
 Selbach mac Ferchair, king of Dál Riata
 Tiberius Petasius, Byzantine usurper
 Yuwen Rong, chancellor of the Tang Dynasty (or 731)
 Zhang Yue, chancellor of the Tang Dynasty (b. 663)

References